Colonel Walter Gawen King  (4 December 1851 – 4 April 1935) was a British Indian army surgeon who served in the Madras Presidency as a sanitary officer and introduced a number of public health measures for the first time in India. The King Institute of Preventive Medicine and Research in Chennai was named in his honour in 1905.

Life 

King was born in England, the son of J. H. King and Laura daughter of George William Marrett, engineer to the Nizam in Hyderabad. He studied medicine at the University of Aberdeen, receiving an MB and CM in 1873 and joined the Indian Medical Service in 1874. He served in the 31's and the 5th Burmah regiments and became a civil surgeon in 1877 at Madras. While posted here, he was a professor of hygiene at the Madras Medical College. During the famines of 1876-77 and 1896-97 in southern India, his services were recognized by the government. He served in Burma from 1906 to 1908. He was made CIE in 1899. He retired to England in 1910 with the rank of colonel and lived in Hendon where he died in 1935.

King's major work was on vaccination and public health. He was involved in the introduction of rules to track movement of people during the plague outbreaks in Madras. He began research at Guindy in 1899 to produce vaccines which resulted in an institute that was formally named as the King Institute and opened on 11 March 1905.

Vaccination and public health 

King was appointed inspector of vaccination in 1890 and used lanolin and vaseline as a medium for storage of smallpox vaccine. In 1892 he became Sanitary Commissioner for Madras and served in this position until 1905. He established a department of public health and developed courses in public health and had sanitary inspectors trained at the Madras Medical College.

Plague management 

In September 1896, the first case of plague in India was reported in Bombay. King immediately issued a circular to the medical officers of the port, warning them of its entrance to the Presidency and advised the local bodies in the Presidency to adopt plague passports, which would enable tracking movement of people from plague affected areas to other parts. In 1903 nearly 79500 plague passports were issued and tracked. He also produced management guidelines which included inspections of ships and transports.

Promotion of soya 

King recognised the nutritional value of soya beans and promoted their cultivation in India. In 1897 he provided seeds to officials in South India to introduce soya bean cultivation in India.

Publications 
King published numerous papers and also published annual reports on vaccination in the Madras Presidency for 1902-03, 1903-04.
 Cultivation of Animal Vaccine (1891)
 Plague Inspector’s Manual (1902)
 Sanitary Rules for the Prevention of Plague in Municipalities (1903)
 Simple Sanitary Rules during Cholera Epidemics.

References

External links 
 The Pioneers of the King Institute
 King's prescription
 King's work on plague
 On King's Burma career and life
 Archives at Cambridge

Companions of the Order of the Indian Empire
19th-century English medical doctors
20th-century English medical doctors
Indian Medical Service officers
1851 births
1935 deaths